The 1954 Wyoming Cowboys football team was an American football team that represented the University of Wyoming as a member of the Skyline Conference during the 1954 college football season.  In their second season under head coach Phil Dickens, the Cowboys compiled a 6–4 record (5–1 against Skyline opponents), finished second in the conference, and outscored opponents by a total of 215 to 171.

Schedule

References

Wyoming
Wyoming Cowboys football seasons
Wyoming Cowboys football